The Faculty Of Science is one of the four faculties which make up the University of Strathclyde, in Glasgow, Scotland. The faculty contains a number of departments offering various undergraduate and postgraduate courses.

Introduction
The Faculty of Science is based on the John Anderson Campus of the University. The faculty has over 3,000 students and receives a grant income for research of over £20million.

The Faculty offers courses at both undergraduate and also postgraduate level, at which teaching and research options are available.

Departments
The faculty consists of five departments, namely:

 Pure & Applied Chemistry
 Mathematics & Statistics
 Computer and Information Sciences
 Physics
 Strathclyde Institute of Pharmacy and Biomedical Sciences (SIPBS)

Pure & Applied Chemistry
Most recently, greater than £10 million was spent on the departments buildings and laboratories. Many graduates from the department work worldwide in research, industry and education.

The Department is home to a number of Centres, namely:
- The Doctoral Training Centre in Synthetic and Medicinal Chemistry
- The Centre for Nanometrology
- The Centre for Process Analysis & Control Technology (CPACT)
- The Centre for Physical Organic Chemistry
- The Centre for Forensic Science

Mathematics & Statistics
This department was previously two separate entities; the Department of Mathematics, and the Department of Statistics and Modelling Science. However, they merged to form the single Department of Mathematics and Statistics.

Research is focused on applied mathematics in the broadest sense, with an emphasis on nonlinear systems and solution of problems with industrial relevance.

Computer & Information Sciences
The Department is engaged in research across Computer and Information Sciences, spanning Artificial Intelligence, Software Engineering, Information Retrieval, Mobile and Ubiquitous Interaction, Functional Programming, Dataflow Systems, Database Indexing and Information Science.

In addition to their research, the Department offers a wide range of undergraduate and postgraduate courses. Many of these are cross disciplinary, with courses jointly run with the Strathclyde Business School and the University's Law School, for example.

Physics
The Department offers undergraduate courses which lead to both the award of BSc and MPhys. They also offer a number of postgraduate taught courses, including Masters courses in: 
- High-Power Radio Frequency Science and Engineering
- Nanoscience
- Optical Technologies
- Photonics and Device Microfabrication 
- Quantum Information and Coherence

The research portfolio of the Department of Physics is among the best in the UK. Based on the Research Excellence Framework (REF) 2014 GPA Scores, Times Higher Education ranked the Department as number one in the UK for physics research. Since 2014 the University's Institute of Photonics has been incorporated within the Department of Physics.

Strathclyde Institute of Pharmacy and Biomedical Sciences (SIPBS)
SIPBS is a major research centre in Scotland and is amongst the UK's top Schools of Pharmacy. It benefited from a new £36 million purpose-built building to harness this department's research in drug discovery and development. The building was completed in 2011.

SIPBS research is focused on New Medicines, Better Medicines and Better Use of Medicines.

Research within the Institute is advanced through six Research Groups:
•	Cardiovascular Research
•	Cell Biology
•	Infection, Immunity and Microbiology
•	Medicines Use and Health
•	Neuroscience
•	Pharmaceutical Sciences

Dean of Faculty
The current dean of the Faculty is Prof. Iain Hunter. He replaces Brian Furman who retired. After being a professor of Molecular Microbiology for 13 years at Strathclyde University he became the dean of the faculty in 2008. Based in the SIPBS department the professor took up his post with "a determination to strengthen links between faculties and with industry." Originally Hunter graduated from Glasgow University with an honours degree in Biochemistry before undertaking a phD in Microbial Physiology (the study of how the microbial cell functions biochemically) again at University of Glasgow.

The professor also works with the Scottish Qualifications Authority in creating the new Curriculum For Excellence Framework in Biology.

Research
The Faculty of Science has the largest number of research students in the University. The Faculty of Science collaborates with many external groups such as the European Space Agency, NASA, NHS Scotland, and the Metropolitan Police.

Former Departments and Research Units

Centre for Digital Library Research 
The Centre for Digital Library Research (CDLR) was a research unit based within the then Information Resource Directorate (IRD) and later the Department of Computer and Information Sciences. It was established in 1999 by Prof. Derek Law, Head of the Information Resources Directorate, as a centre of expertise in digital library research and digital library development activities. It later contributed to the research portfolio of the Department of Computer and Information Sciences, including the Research Assessment Exercise and Research Excellence Framework. The Centre was disbanded in 2011 following organisational changes at the University of Strathclyde.

The Centre was originally established to further the application of web technologies within the context of digital libraries, thereby contributing to the development of national and global networked information services. This often entailed the concept of holistic approaches to system development  whereby tangible technical outputs were interconnected and used to further research of a specific issue or problem. During its operation the Centre received numerous grants from a wide variety of funders, including the Jisc, the Scottish Funding Council (SFC), the European Commission, the British Academy, the New Opportunities Fund and others. A number of these grants, particularly those from the Jisc, funded the creation of service nodes within the Jisc's Information Environment, such as terminology services  and federated search tools. Research specialisms for the Centre were varied but included topics such as digital content creation and maintenance, resource discovery, syntactic and semantic interoperability across distributed digital libraries and repositories, metadata schema, digitization and digital preservation.

Although the Centre ceased operations in 2011, some of its technical outputs from research and development activities, such as the Glasgow Digital Library, remain available and supported by the University of Strathclyde Library.

Perhaps the best known of the Centre's technical outputs was the BUBL Information Service. Originally predating the advancements in web searching offered by emergent services like Google, BUBL offered a searchable directory of specially selected and described web resources, covering all subjects of academic relevance for the UK higher education community. The directory BUBL operated was similar to the Yahoo! Directory but was instead organised, described and navigable according to the Dewey Decimal Classification (DDC) system

See also 
University of Strathclyde
Strathclyde Business School
University of Strathclyde Faculty of Engineering

References

External links
 

University of Strathclyde